Union sportive Colomiers Rugby or US Colomiers is a French rugby union club currently competing in Pro D2, the second level of the French rugby pyramid. They had been relegated from Pro D2 after finishing last in the 2006-07 season, but earned promotion from Fédérale 1 at the first opportunity in 2007-08, and survived a relegation scare in 2008–09, finishing 14th, in the last safe position. The club was relegated from Pro D2 in the 2010–11 season. The club, based in Colomiers in the Haute-Garonne département of Occitania, was founded in 1915 and plays at the Stade Michel Bendichou (capacity 11,000). The players wear blue and white. Colomiers have been runners-up in the French championship and Heineken Cup, as well as winners of the European Challenge Cup.

US Colomiers were established in 1915. Colomiers had various European success in the late 1990s. In 1998 they won the European Challenge Cup, the competition below the Heineken Cup, defeating fellow French club SU Agen in the final. The following season they competed in the Heineken Cup. They made it all the way to the final, which took place at Lansdowne Road, Dublin. The capacity crowd saw Irish side Ulster win 21 points to 6.

Colomiers also competed in the 1999-00 and 2000-01 Heineken Cups, but did not make the finals stages of the tournament. The club made its first domestic championship final when they met Stade Français in 2000. The Paris club won the game 28 points to 23 at Stade de France. In 2005 they were crowned Fédérale 1 champions and were promoted back up to Rugby Pro D2, but went back down to Fédérale 1 after two seasons in the second flight. They again claimed the Fédérale 1 title in 2008 to return to Pro D2.

Honours
 French championship:
 Runners-up: 2000
 Heineken Cup:
 Runners-up: 1999
 European Challenge Cup:
 Champions: 1998
 Fédérale 1:
 Champions: 2005, 2008

Finals results

French championship

Heineken Cup

European Challenge Cup

Current standings

Current squad

The squad for the 2022–23 season is:

Espoirs squad

Notable former players

 Jean-Luc Sadourny / 1984-2003
 Fabien Galthié / 1985-2001
 Yannick Bru / 1997-1998
 David Skrela / 1997-2003 and 2013-2016
 Patrick Tabacco / 1997-2000
 Marc Dal Maso / 1998-2000
 Yannick Jauzion / 1999-2002
 Francis Ntamack / 1999-2004 and 2006-2007
 Julien Arias / 2001-2004
 Hugues Miorin / 2002-2003
 Yannick Forestier / 2003-2004
 Thierry Dusautoir / 2003-2004
 Jean-Philippe Grandclaude / 2003-2004
 Patricio Albacete / 2003-2004
 Benjamin Thiéry / 2003-2004
 Jonathan Wisniewski / 2007
 François Tardieu / 2017-2018

Coaches
 Jean-Luc Sadourny
 Bernard de Giusti

See also
 List of rugby union clubs in France
 Rugby union in France

References

External links
  Union Sportive Colomiers Rugby Official website
 The Fourth Heineken Cup Final

Colomiers
Rugby clubs established in 1915
Sport in Haute-Garonne
1915 establishments in France